George Alexander Doumani (born April 26, 1929, deceased March 16, 2021 in Akko, British Mandate of Palestine) is a Lebanese Palestinian geologist and explorer. 
He joined Terra Sancta College in Jerusalem and awarded the Palestinian matric in 1948, during the 1948 Palestinian exodus he left with his family to Bkassine village in Lebanon.
He went to Saudi Arabia in 1949 and worked in oil field.
He graduated from University of California, Berkeley. He contributed to the International Geophysical Year in 1958 in Antarctica. He made other trips to the southern continent in the early 1960s. His findings helped prove the continental drift theory. Two Antarctic mountains are named after him: Mount Doumani and Doumani Peak. In 1999 he published a book about Antarctica, The Frigid Mistress: Life and Exploration in Antarctica.

References

Living people
1929 births
Lebanese geologists
Palestinian geologists
University of California, Berkeley alumni